The Berkut (Russian Беркут, meaning golden eagle) is a space suit model developed to be used for extravehicular activity for the Voskhod 2 mission aboard a Voskhod spacecraft on the first spacewalk. It was developed by NPP Zvezda in 1964–1965. It was a modified SK-1 suit. It was only used by the Voskhod 2 crew.

Specifications 
The suit had two pressurization settings, one at 0.27 atmospheres and the other at 0.40 atmospheres (nominal mode). Life support was contained in a back pack, which had a large enough oxygen supply to last for 45 minutes of activity. Movement within the suit was seriously restricted.

Name: Berkut Spacesuit
Derived from: SK-1 spacesuit
Manufacturer: NPP Zvezda
Missions: Voskhod 2
Function: Intra-vehicular activity (IVA) and orbital Extra-vehicular activity (EVA)
Operating Pressure:  
Suit Weight: 
Backpack Weight: 
Total Weight: 
Primary Life Support: 45 minutes

References

 Berkut at Encyclopedia Astronautica
 http://galspace.spb.ru/museum-1.php?foto_page=38

External links
 Video of Voskod 2 mission (Russian) 
 Photo of Berkut space suit at Memorial Museum of Cosmonautics in Moscow (38 & 39)
 Photo of outermost layer removed

Soviet and Russian spacesuits
Voskhod program